Howard Lewis may refer to:

 Howard B. Lewis (1887–1954), chemistry professor
 Howard Lew Lewis (1941–2018), English comedian and actor